NK Međimurje is a Croatian football club based in Čakovec. The club is named after Međimurje, the region in northern Croatia where Čakovec is located. 

The club play their home games at the Stadion SRC Mladost, Čakovec, which has a total capacity of approximately 6,000. The club's supporters group is called the Angels.

History
The club was founded in June 2003 and started to compete in the Croatian Second League, where they replaced NK Omladinac, a club based in the Čakovec suburb of Novo Selo Rok. They finished top of the league at the end of the 2003–04 season, clinching promotion to the Croatian First League.

They started their first season in the top flight with three defeats in their opening three matches, before beating Zagreb 1–0 on the road on Day 4 to clinch their first win of the season. However, they continued to experience very little success after that, only grabbing two further wins in the following 18 matches and being bottom of the table as the league split into two groups in March 2005. Their performance improved in the bottom-6 group, the Relegation League, where they had a streak of seven games undefeated and finished fifth, overtaking Zadar on the final day of the season.

In their second top-flight season in 2005–06, they once again found themselves bottom of the table in March, although with five wins and only one point fewer than both Inter Zaprešić and Slaven Belupo. After three defeats in their opening three matches in the Relegation League, they managed a streak of seven games undefeated and overtook Inter Zaprešić after beating them on the penultimate day of the season.

In 2006–07, they experienced mixed fortunes in their opening seven games, but then managed four consecutive wins and even found themselves in fourth place after Day 11. They eventually finished the season in ninth place, their best result in the top flight, with 11 wins in 33 matches. The 2007–08 season, however, brought very little success and they found themselves bottom of the table for majority of the season. They eventually finished rock-bottom, with only 15 points and mere three wins from 33 matches, 18 points behind the 11th-place Inter Zaprešić, and were effectively relegated to the Croatian Second League.

In 2008–09, they finished fifth in the Croatian Second League, but were nevertheless directly promoted back to the Croatian First League for the 2009–10 season as the league was expanded to 16 teams and Slavonac CO, who finished above them, decided to withdraw from the top flight after failing to secure a proper stadium as their home ground.

In the first half of the 2009–10 season, they performed well at home, recording five wins and two draws in nine matches, but poor performance on the road (they lost all eight away matches) saw them start the second half of the season in 13th place, just above the relegation zone. Despite winning two away matches in the second half of the season, a series of draws and defeats (including a crushing 5–1 defeat at home to Rijeka) saw them dropping into the relegation zone with six matches left. A 4–1 defeat at Hajduk Split on the penultimate day of the season confirmed their 15th-place finish and relegation back to the second division. The 4–1 loss was later investigated for match fixing allegations.

In 2010–2011 season, they finished seventh in the Croatian Second League, they finished strong in last six games but that was not enough to return to Croatian First League. During the season they had three managers. In Croatian Football Cup they lost to HNK Rijeka in away match 1:0 in Last 16 round.

The 2011–2012 season was tough for former first division club marking they first relegation to third level football in Croatia. Four managers try to avoid relegation during the season.

The seasons 2012-2013 and 2013–2014 mark the success in Croatian Third League North with finishing first season second and second season first but in either season they did not make the financial criteria for promotion in Croatian Second League.

In three consecutive seasons 2014–2015, 2015-2016 and 2016-2017 they finished third, first and first in Croatian Third League East but in every season they also did not meet the financial criteria for promotion in Croatian Second League. This successful period of NK Međimurje history was led by manager Mario Kovačević.

Season 2017-2018 was finally the year when they met financial criteria for promotion but they struggled all season for conformation on the football pitch. Nevertheless, they were finally promoted in the Croatian Second League. The manager of this success was Matija Kristić.

Season 2018-2019 was first season in Croatian Second League after six seasons in third level football in Croatia. They started very well, and after six rounds they were in second position behind NK Varaždin. After the sixth round they were in battle to avoid relegation and they succeeded in last round with win in home match against NK Zadar.

The 2019-2020 was cancelled due to the world-wide pandemic of Coronavirus (COVID-19) and before pandemic started they were in 10th place of 16 teams in Croatian Second League. The manager at the start of the season was Matija Kristić but he was sacked after the third round, and was succeeded by young manager Damir Lepen-Jurak.

In 2020–21 season NK Međimurje signed former player of NK Međimurje Goran Vincetić. The season started excellent, after twelve rounds they were second behind NK Hrvatski Dragovoljac but then Coronavirus cases were found in the team players so the team was in isolation for two weeks. Team perform poorly in last four matches with all four lost. Goran Vincetić was sacked in mid-season and former manager of NK Međimurje Mario Kovačević was hired. Kovačević started badly with the team so he was also sacked after only five games. Davor Mladina was also hired but he only lasted two games with both losses. In late March Marijan Uršanić stepped down as president and August Jesenović was appointed as new president. He hired Marko Lozo as new manager but he also did not make good results so he was sacked after 1–6 loss against HNK Hajduk II. Last two fixtures was led by Nikola Goričanec who was assistant coach to all four managers this season. After long season NK Međimurje was relegated in third division.

In 2021-22 good start in Croatian Third League group North, bad finish and bad second half of the season put the club in position were they lost possibility for promotion in Croatian second League. In qualification for promotion in Croatian Third League they won match against NK Hrvatski Vitez 3:0. For the first time in 5 seasons club lost the County Cup.

Northern Derby
During seasons when they are both in the same league (generally 3. HNL or 2. HNL), Međimurje have contested the Northern Derby with NK Varaždin.

Current squad

Personnel

|}

Club honours
Croatian Second League
Winners (1): 2003–04
Croatian Third League North
Winners (1): 2013–14
Runners-up (2): 2012–13
Croatian Third League East
Winners (2): 2015–16, 2016–17
Third place (3): 2014–15, 2017–18

Seasons

Key

Top scorer shown in bold when he was also top scorer for the division.

P = Played
W = Games won
D = Games drawn
L = Games lost
F = Goals for
A = Goals against
Pts = Points
Pos = Final position

1. HNL = Croatian First League
2. HNL = Croatian Second League
3. HNL = Croatian Third League

PR = Preliminary round
R1 = Round 1
R2 = Round 2
QF = Quarter-finals
SF = Semi-finals
RU = Runners-up
W  = Winners

Historical list of coaches

Youth academy

|}

References

External links
Međimurje profile at UEFA.com
Međimurje profile at Sportnet.hr 

 
Medjimurje
Medjimurje
Medjimurje
Sport in Čakovec
2003 establishments in Croatia